Thomas Whitmarsh Cardozo (December 19, 1838 – April 13, 1881) was an American educator, journalist, and public official during the Reconstruction Era in the United States. He served as State Superintendent of Education in Mississippi and is the first African American to have held the position.

Early life
 

Thomas Cardozo was born free in Charleston, South Carolina in 1838. His father, Isaac Nunez Cardozo, was part of a well-known Jewish family and was a weigher in the U.S. Customs House of Charleston for 24 years, until his death in 1855. Thomas's mother was Lydia Weston, a freed slave of mixed ancestry who was a seamstress. He had two older brothers, Henry Cardozo and Francis Lewis Cardozo, and two older sisters, Lydia Frances Cardozo and Eslanda Cardozo. 

In Charleston, Thomas was among the "free-Negro elite" and went to private schools for free black children, mainly taught by free black teachers. He was also taught by his father Isaac and his uncle Jacob Cardozo, who was an economist and newspaper publisher.

The Fugitive Slave Act of 1850 and the secession movement caused free people of color to be concerned about being enslaved. When Isaac Cardozo died during this worsening time, Thomas's family  lost their protector. Thomas was 17 at the time and became an apprentice in a company that manufactured rice-threshing machines.

In 1857, two years after his father's death, Thomas moved to New York where he continued his education. In June 1858, his mother, sisters, and brother Henry left Charleston on the steamship Nashville for New York; by 1860 they had settled in Cleveland, Ohio. His brother Francis was in school in Glasgow, Scotland. At the Newburgh Collegiate Institute, Thomas took academic courses and trained to be a teacher. Before he could graduate, civil war broke out and he began teaching in 1861. He married Laura J. Williams, a teacher and accomplished musician who was from a mixed-race family in Brooklyn. Thomas and Laura became parents with a son, Alvin, born in 1863, and another son, Francis, in 1865.

Career in education
Shortly after the beginning of the American Civil War, Cardozo began teaching in Staten Island, New York at the segregated school in Stapleton. On behalf of the African Americans there, in 1863 in the local newspaper he thanked  "the friends and benefactors" for their aid after the New York City draft riots had spread to Staten Island. In April 1865 at the end of the war, Thomas and his family moved from Flushing, New York to his home town of Charleston, South Carolina.

In Charleston in the challenging turmoil of the weeks following the end of the Civil War, he supervised the educational activities of the American Missionary Association (AMA). He obtained building space and books. He supervised teachers, hired new teachers, and ran the AMA house for teachers who came down from the north. All this was in the context of disputes between the various aid agencies there. Cardozo was the first AMA school principal in Charleston at the Tappan School.

A few months after he began work in Charleston, the AMA became aware of a previous affair that the married Thomas Cardozo had with a female student of his in New York. Also, the AMA was dissatisfied with his accounting of his expenditures back then and suspected that some of the expenditures went to the young woman. The AMA asked his brother Francis Cardozo to discuss this with him in Charleston. Francis reported back that Thomas had the affair through "weakness", had “not been deliberately wicked”, and didn't misappropriate any AMA funds. Thomas asked for forgiveness. In response, the AMA replaced Thomas with Francis  around September 1865.

Thomas stayed in Charleston and became a grocer for a few months until his store burnt down. He moved to Baltimore, Maryland where he and his wife taught at the Negro Industrial School for a short time. When the school lost its funding in 1866, he and his family moved to Syracuse, New York. There, with the help of Samuel Joseph May, he raised funds for teaching in Elizabeth City, North Carolina in a program of the New York Freedmen's Union Commission.

In the spring of 1869, the Cardozos moved to Elizabeth City  where Thomas and his wife taught for about four months until the program ended. They went back to the North to try to find support for their educational work in North Carolina. Cardozo brought with him a letter of commendation from North Carolina U. S. Senator John Pool that was endorsed by North Carolina Governor William Woods Holden and other state officials. After Cardozo gained the support of a branch of the Freedmen's Union Commission, he obtained a thousand dollars from the Freedmen's Bureau for construction of a normal school in Elizabeth City to train high school graduates to be teachers. It opened in the fall of 1870 with 123 students.

In January 1871, Thomas Cardozo and his family moved to Vicksburg, Mississippi where he and his wife immediately began teaching. Several years later he served as State Superintendent of Education from 1874 to 1876. Cardozo proposed uniform textbooks for Mississippi schools during his tenure.

Career in politics

In New York, Cardozo had written in 1868 and 1869 in the National Anti-Slavery Standard about the place for blacks in the evolving political situation of reconstruction. As a republican, Cardozo ran for Sheriff of Pasquotank County, North Carolina and lost on August 4, 1870. Five months later he moved to Vicksburg, Mississippi in January 1871.

Because of the demographics of Mississippi, public office for Cardozo was a good possibility after satisfying the six-month residency requirement in July 1871. He joined the Republican Party, was elected circuit court clerk of Warren County and took office on January 1, 1872. He wrote accounts of his experiences in Mississippi, including descriptions of his fellow Republican politicians, for the New National Era under the pseudonym "Civis".  He was a delegate to the 1873 National Civil Rights Convention in Washington, D.C.

In November 1873, Cardozo was elected State Superintendent of Education in Mississippi, along with the election of Governor Adelbert Ames, Lieutenant Governor Alexander K. Davis and Secretary of State James Hill.  Although he was the first African-American to hold the post, Cardozo did not challenge the de facto racial segregation that existed in Mississippi schools. 

In August 1874, conservative whites took over the Vicksburg city government and Cardozo  was charged with crimes while he was circuit court clerk in 1872. First he was charged with receiving money for falsified witness certificates and then additionally charged with embezzling money paid by land owners for redeeming land taken by the government for unpaid taxes. He appeared before a magistrate on September 7, 1874 and bond was posted. He was indicted in November 1874 and tried beginning May 6, 1875. The jury failed to reach a verdict. He was able to get the retrial moved from Vicksburg to Jackson with a new trial date in July 1876.

After the first trial, the ongoing political attacks by conservative whites against Republican office holders turned into violence. On July 4, 1875 in Vicksburg, a white mob attacked a meeting where Cardozo was to speak, followed by street violence where several blacks were killed or injured. City officials helped Cardozo, the main target of the attacks, escape from the city.

The occupying Union Army began to withdraw from the South in 1875 in the last years of the Reconstruction era. White Democrats had regained control of the Mississippi state legislature by a program of violence and intimidation against Republican black voters. The legislators brought impeachment charges against Superintendent Cardozo and senate impeachment proceedings began February 11, 1876. The most incriminating charge was that he embezzled money from Tougaloo University. Cardozo was granted permission to resign with the charges against him dismissed, and submitted his resignation on March 22, 1876. 

Leaving the politics, an upcoming trial in Jackson in July 1876,  and the dangerous situation in Mississippi, Cardozo moved to Newton, Massachusetts. There he worked for the postal service until his death from disease in 1881. He was forty-two. Thomas Cardozo Middle School in Jackson, Mississippi, of the Jackson Public School District, is named for him and opened in 2010.

See also
 List of African-American officeholders during Reconstruction

Notes

References

Further reading
 
 Writings in the New National Era 
– by Thomas Cardozo under the pseudonym Civis,
1871: Sep 14,  Oct 26, Nov 23, Dec 21
1872: Jan 18, Feb 8, Apr 4,  Apr 25, May 16, Jun 6,  Aug 8, Aug 29, Sep 26, Oct 17, Nov 21, Dec 26
1873: Feb 20, Mar 13, Apr 3, Apr 17, May 29, Jun 19, Jul 3, Aug 21, Sep 11,  Oct 23, Oct 30, Dec 11
1874: Feb 19, Jul 2
– by Cardozo under his own name — Aug 3, 1871
– by others about Cardozo/Civis — R. W. Fluornoy, Oct 12, 1871 ; Student, May 2, 1872 ; Dufoy, Jan 16, 1873 ; May 8, 1873 ; H. C. Carter, Nov 20, 1873 ; Robert C. MacGregor, Jul 16, 1874 
– a reprint from the Mississippi Pilot about Cardozo — Sep 18, 1873

1838 births
1881 deaths
African-American politicians during the Reconstruction Era
American people of Jewish descent
Politicians from Charleston, South Carolina
19th-century American educators
African-American educators